Carey Wilson (May 19, 1889 – February 1, 1962) was an American screenwriter, voice actor, and producer.

Life and career
Born in 1889 in Philadelphia, Wilson's screenplays include Ben-Hur (1925), Mutiny on the Bounty (1935), and The Great Heart (1938). His credits as producer include Green Dolphin Street (1947). He also narrated many nuclear test films, produced by the Atomic Energy Commission – now the United States Department of Energy – and by the United States Department of Defense, including ones on Operation Sandstone (1948) and Operation Greenhouse (1951).

Wilson was one of the thirty-six Hollywood pioneers who founded the Academy of Motion Picture Arts and Sciences in 1927. He also collaborated with Jean Harlow on her novel Today is Tonight.

Legacy
For his contribution in films, Wilson has a star on the Hollywood Walk of Fame, located on 6301 Hollywood Blvd.

In a 2011 episode of the reality TV series Pawn Stars, Wilson's granddaughter was featured, as she sold a cigarette lighter and ID badge that had belonged to him during his time as a propaganda filmmaker for the United States government.

Selected filmography

Writer/producer

 Madonnas and Men (1920)
 A Woman's Business (1920)
 The Cup of Life (1921)
 Red Lights (1923)
 Three Weeks (1924)
 Wine of Youth (1924)
 Empty Hands (1924)
 The Midshipman (1925)
 The Masked Bride (1925)
 Soul Mates (1925)
 Ben-Hur (1925)
 The Silent Lover (1926)
 The Tender Hour (1927)
 The Stolen Bride (1927)
 The Awakening (1928)
 Geraldine (1929)
 The Bad One (1930)
 Fanny Foley Herself (1931)
 Behind Office Doors (1931)
 Gabriel Over the White House (1933)
 Bolero (1934)
 Mutiny on the Bounty (1935)

 The Boss Didn't Say Good Morning (1937)
 What Do You Think?: Tupapaoo (1938)
 The Great Heart (1938)
 Nostradamus (1938)
 Prophet Without Honor (1939)
 Miracle at Lourdes (1939)
 A Door Will Open (1940)
 A Failure at Fifty (1940)
 More About Nostradamus (1941)
 Further Prophecies of Nostradamus (1942)
 You, John Jones! (1943)
 Nostradamus IV (1944)
 Strange Destiny (1945)

Producer
 The Stolen Bride (1927)
 The Postman Always Rings Twice (1946)
 Green Dolphin Street (1947), producer
 Dark Delusion (1947), co-producer
 The Red Danube (1950), producer
 Scaramouche (1952), producer

References

External links

1889 births
1962 deaths
Academy of Motion Picture Arts and Sciences founders
American male film actors
American film producers
American male screenwriters
American male voice actors
20th-century American male actors
20th-century American male writers
20th-century American screenwriters